Little Panoche Creek formerly known as Arroyita de Panoche or Arroyo de Pannochita   (Little Sugarloaf Creek) and later anglicized to Panochita Creek is a creek in Fresno County, California.  The source of this creek is on the east slope of Glaucophane Ridge, of the Diablo Range in San Benito County.  It flows east-northeast through Little Panoche Reservoir to empty into the California Aqueduct.  Before the advent of irrigation projects in the valley, its waters might have reached a slough of the San Joaquin River in years of heavy rains.

History 
Arroyita de Panoche was a watering place on El Camino Viejo in the San Joaquin Valley between Arroyo de Las Ortigalito (Little Nettle Creek) and Arroyo de Panoche Grande (Big Sugarloaf Creek).

References

Rivers of Fresno County, California
Tributaries of the San Joaquin River
Diablo Range
Geography of the San Joaquin Valley
El Camino Viejo
Rivers of Northern California